Looping the Loop (German: Die Todesschleife) is a 1928 German silent thriller film directed by Arthur Robison and starring Werner Krauss, Jenny Jugo and Warwick Ward. The film was produced by UFA. It was shot at the Babelsberg Studios in Berlin and on location in London. The film's sets were designed by the art directors Robert Herlth and Walter Röhrig. As with UFA's Variety, Paramount Pictures handled the film's American distribution as part of the Parufamet agreement.

Cast
 Werner Krauss as Botto, ein berühmter Clown 
 Jenny Jugo as Blanche Valette 
 Warwick Ward as Andre Melton, Artist 
 Gina Manès as Hanna, Kunstschützin 
 Sig Arno as Sigi, Hannas Partner 
 Max Gülstorff as Blanches Verwandter 
 Lydia Potechina as Blanches Verwandte 
 Gyula Szőreghy as Ein Agent 
 Harry Grunwald

References

Bibliography
 Bergfelder, Tim & Bock, Hans-Michael. The Concise Cinegraph: Encyclopedia of German. Berghahn Books, 2009.
 St. Pierre, Paul Matthew. E.A. Dupont and his Contribution to British Film: Varieté, Moulin Rouge, Piccadilly, Atlantic, Two Worlds, Cape Forlorn''. Fairleigh Dickinson University Press, 2010.

External links

1928 films
Films of the Weimar Republic
German silent feature films
German thriller films
Films directed by Arthur Robison
Circus films
UFA GmbH films
Paramount Pictures films
German black-and-white films
1920s thriller films
Silent thriller films
1920s German films
Films shot in London
Films shot at Babelsberg Studios